Flavius Sosipater Charisius ( 4th century AD) was a Latin grammarian.

He was probably an African by birth, summoned to Constantinople to take the place of Euanthius, a learned commentator on Terence.

Ars Grammatica 
The Ars Grammatica, in five books, is addressed to his son (not a Roman, as the preface shows). The surviving text is incomplete: the beginning of the first, part of the fourth, and the greater part of the fifth book are lost.

The work, which is a compendium, is valuable as it contains excerpts from the earlier writers on grammar, who are in many cases mentioned by name: Remmius Palaemon, Julius Romanus (Gaius Iulius Romanus), Comminianus.

The edition of Heinrich Keil, in Grammatici Latini, i. (1857), has been superseded by that of Karl Barwick (1925).

References 

 Article by G. Gotz in Pauly-Wissowa, III. 2 (1899)
 Teuffel, Wilhelm Sigismund and Schwabe, Ludwig von, History of Roman Literature (Engl. trans), Vol. I. 2
 Frohde, in Jahr. f. Philol., 18 Suppl. (1892), 567–672

External links
Corpus Grammaticorum Latinorum: complete texts and full bibliography

Grammarians of Latin
Ancient linguists
4th-century Latin writers